Fujiwara no Kinsue (藤原 公季; 957–1029), also known as  Kaikō, was a Japanese statesman, courtier and politician during the Heian period.

Career
Kinsue served as a minister during the reign of Emperor Go-Ichijō.

 997 (Chōtoku 3, 7th month): Kinsue was promoted from the office of dainagon to naidaijin.
 1017 (Kannin 1, 3rd month): Kinsue is made udaijin.
 1021 (Jian 1, 7th month): Kinsue was promoted from the office of udaijin to daijō daijin.
 1029 (Chōgen 2, 10th month): Daijō daijin Kinsue died; and he was posthumously named Kai-kō. He was given the posthumous title of as Jingi-kō (仁義公).

Genealogy
This member of the Fujiwara clan was a son of Morosuke.   Kinsue's mother was Imperial Princess Kōshi, daughter of Emperor Daigo. She died in Kinsue's childhood; and he was brought up by his sister Empress Anshi, who was a consort of Emperor Murakami.

Kinsue was the youngest of his four brothers: Kaneie,  Kanemichi,  Koretada, and Tamemitsu.

Kinsue, also known as Kan'in Kinsue, is the progenitor of Kan'in family (閑院家) which was later divided into Sanjō family, Saionji Family, Tokudaiji family and the Tōin family.

Kinsue was married to a daughter of Imperial Prince Ariakira; and from this marriage, three children were produced:
 Gishi (義子) (974–1053) - married to Emperor Ichijō
 Sanenari (実成) (975–1004) - Chūnagon
 Nyogen (如源) (977–1021) - priest (Sanmai Sōzu, 三昧僧都)

Notes

References
 Brinkley, Frank and Dairoku Kikuchi. (1915). A History of the Japanese People from the Earliest Times to the End of the Meiji Era. New York: Encyclopædia Britannica. OCLC 413099
 Hosaka, Hiroshi. (1981). 大鏡: 全現代語訳 (Ōkagami: zen gendaigoyaku).  Tokyo: Kōdansha. ;  OCLC 29229916
 Nussbaum, Louis-Frédéric and Käthe Roth. (2005).  Japan encyclopedia. Cambridge: Harvard University Press. ;  OCLC 58053128
 Owada, Tetsuo, Masako Sugawara and Atsushi Nitō. (2003). 日本史諸家系図人名辞典 (Nihonshi shoka keizu jinmei jiten).  Tokyo: Kōdansha. ;  OCLC 675318472
 Titsingh, Isaac. (1834).  Annales des empereurs du Japon (Nihon Odai Ichiran).  Paris: Royal Asiatic Society, Oriental Translation Fund of Great Britain and Ireland. OCLC 5850691

957 births
1029 deaths
Fujiwara clan